Andrew Williams Loomis (June 27, 1797 – August 24, 1873) was a U.S. Representative from Ohio during the year 1837.

Biography 
Born in Lebanon, Connecticut, Loomis earned his law degree from Union College, Schenectady, New York, in 1819. He was admitted to the bar, and moved to Canton, Ohio to practice law. He then moved to New Lisbon (now Lisbon), Ohio. He served as delegate to the National-Republican State convention in 1827 and 1828.

Loomis was elected as a Whig to the Twenty-fifth Congress and served from March 4, 1837, until October 20, 1837, when he resigned.

He then relocated to Pittsburgh, Pennsylvania in 1839, and resumed his legal practice. He served as member of the Peace Conference of 1861 held in Washington, D.C., in an effort to devise means to prevent the impending war. 

Sometime around 1868, he moved to Cleveland, Ohio.

Death and interment
Loomis died while on a visit to Cumberland, Maryland on August 24, 1873. He was interred in the Allegheny Cemetery, in Pittsburgh, Pennsylvania.

Sources

External links

1797 births
1873 deaths
People from Lebanon, Connecticut
People from Lisbon, Ohio
Ohio lawyers
Pennsylvania lawyers
Union College (New York) alumni
Whig Party members of the United States House of Representatives from Ohio
19th-century American politicians
Burials at Allegheny Cemetery
19th-century American lawyers